Aviatorśke or Aviatorskoye is an urban-type settlement in Dnipro Raion within Dnipropetrovsk Oblast of eastern Ukraine. It belongs to Dnipro urban hromada, one of the hromadas of Ukraine. Population: 

Aviatorske is located about 12 kilometres in the southeast of Dnipro city centre. Dnipro International Airport is situated in the vicinity.

Until 18 July 2020, Aviatorske belonged to Dnipro Municipality, the administrative division subordinated to the city of oblast significance of Dnipro. The municipality was abolished in July 2020 as part of the administrative reform of Ukraine, which reduced the number of raions of Dnipropetrovsk Oblast to seven. The area of Dnipro Municipality was merged into Dnipro Raion.

References

Notes

Sources
 Авиаторское (Аэропорт) (in Russian).

Urban-type settlements in Dnipro Raion
Neighborhoods of Dnipro